On the morning of October 19, 1998, a group of people part of the Earth Liberation Front set fire to several lifts and buildings at Vail Ski Resort. This was one of the most serious ecotage attacks in the history of the United States, causing $12 million in damages, which caught the attention of the nation. The fires were set at Two Elk Lodge, and destroyed multiple buildings on Vail Mountain, including Two Elk Restaurant. In 2006, Chelsea Dawn Gerlach and Stanislas Gregory Meyerhoff both pleaded guilty to the attacks.

In August 2018, suspect Joseph Dibee, on the run for 12 years, was en route to Russia when he was apprehended in Cuba, then returned to the United States. Josephine Sunshine Overaker, believed to have fled to Europe in 2001, remains at large and is wanted by the FBI.

References

Arson in Colorado
Earth Liberation Front
Attacks in the United States in 1998
Vail arson